Hermansen is a surname. Notable people with the surname include:

Chad Hermansen (born 1977), former Major League Baseball outfielder
Chris Hermansen (born 1975), retired Danish football player
Edith Hermansen (1907–1988), Danish film actress
Even Helte Hermansen (born 1982), Norwegian guitarist
Henry Hermansen (born 1921), Norwegian cross country skier who competed in the 1950s
Ole Hermansen (1893–1942), Norwegian trade unionist
Omar Hermansen (born 1913), Danish boxer who competed in the 1936 Summer Olympics
Robert Hermansen, Norwegian former CEO of Store Norske Spitsbergen Kulkompani
Tor Erik Hermansen of Stargate (record producers), based in Los Angeles
Tormod Hermansen (born 1940), former CEO of Telenor and State Secretary of Finansdepartementet (1978–1979)

See also
Murder of Benjamin Hermansen (1985–2001), Norwegian-Ghanaian boy whose father was born in Ghana, his mother was Norwegian
Hermansen Island (Norwegian: Hermansenøya), an island in Oscar II Land at Spitsbergen, Svalbard
Hermansen Island Bird Sanctuary (Norwegian: Hermansenøya fuglereservat), a bird reserve at Svalbard, Norway
Hermannsson
Hermanson
Hermansson

Danish-language surnames
Norwegian-language surnames